Low Brunton is a small village in Northumberland, England.  Nearby settlements include Humshaugh, Chollerford and Walwick.

Early history
Hadrian's Wall runs just south of Low Brunton, with the remains of Brunton Turret (26b), just over 26 Roman Miles from the eastern end of the Wall at Wallsend, Newcastle upon Tyne. The turret (stone tower) is noted because its construction displays the difference between the original plan to build the wall ten feet thick, and the revised scheme at a reduced eight feet.

Governance 
Low Brunton is in the parliamentary constituency of Hexham.

See also
Chollerford Bridge

References

External links

Villages in Northumberland
Wall, Northumberland